Q'ara Willk'i (Aymara q'ara bald, bare, willk'i gap, "bald gap", also spelled Khara Willkhi) is a  mountain in the Bolivian Andes. It is located in the Cochabamba Department, Tapacari Province. Q'ara Willk'i lies northwest of Lluxita.

References 

Mountains of Cochabamba Department